David Lynch: The Art Life is a 2016 documentary film directed by Jon Nguyen. The film follows director David Lynch's upbringing in Montana, Washington State, and Idaho, his initial move to Philadelphia to pursue a career as a painter, to the beginning of the production of Eraserhead.

Production
David Lynch: The Art Life was made over four years as the filmmakers filmed and recorded over 20 conversations with Lynch at his home. The staff of the film had previously collaborated on making the film Lynch One, which was about the making of Inland Empire.

The film received production through a Kickstarter campaign.

Release
Prior to the films premiere, Film Constellation purchased the world sales rights to The Art Life.
David Lynch: The Art Life premiered at the 73rd Venice International Film Festival on September 4, 2016. The film received a limited release domestically on March 31, 2017.

The film was released on Blu-ray Disc by The Criterion Collection.

Reception
On the aggregator website Rotten Tomatoes, The Art Life currently holds a 91% approval rating, based on 77 reviews, with an average rating of 7.4/10. The website's critical consensus reads, "David Lynch: The Art Life offers a look at the director's life and craft whose unusual approach is in keeping with its subject's singularly strange aesthetic." On Metacritic, the film received a rating of 75 out of 100, based on 17 reviews, indicating "generally favorable reviews".

References

External links
Official Janus Films site

David Lynch: The Art Life: Go with Ideas an essay by Dennis Lim at the Criterion Collection

American documentary films
2016 documentary films
Documentary films about film directors and producers
David Lynch
Kickstarter-funded documentaries
2010s English-language films
2010s American films